Dorymyrmex goetschi is a species of ant in the genus Dorymyrmex. Described by Goetsch in 1933, the species is endemic to Chile.

References

Dorymyrmex
Hymenoptera of South America
Insects described in 1933
Endemic fauna of Chile